Hassan Bastani , born 1962 in Tehran) is an Iranian  researcher, playwright, designer, theater director, and screenwriter.

He started his professional achievement in Playwright and theater direction since 1995 and has written more than 35 and directed 12 plays up to now. Most of his plays were participated in nation and international festivals in Iran and other countries (14 international theater festivals in Iran and 4 ones aboard)He received 29 honored diploma and appreciation tablets from national festivals and 5 honored diploma from international festivals. Also, He had 2 public performances in Georgia (2005) and Colombia(2010).
Hassan Bastani is administrator of "education and research committee" and "board member "of Playwrights and translators association of the Iranian theater forum,  also founder and supervisor of Adonai Theater group in 2006. Bastani besides researching on Persian ancient scripture, culture and mythology  has involved on playwriting plays with cultural, ancient literary and folkloric theme also antiwar works.

Education 

Hassan Bastani entered to School Theater in 1976. Some years later he became a teacher and began his corporation with Deylaman theater group. He staged his first professional directing work at Isfahan University of Technology, in 1989. Also In 1989, he graduated in [Mining Exploration] from, Iran. He passed Superlative Training Courses of Playwriting from Islamic Development Organization in 1991 and Superlative Training Courses of Playwritingand screenwritingby Bahram Beyzaie from Hamid Samandarian Institute in 1995. Now he is studying Theology at Nations University.

Career

Theaters and playwrights 

 Dash Akol
 Sugmehr (Mehr Tragedy)
 Mother of all those Esfandyars
 Landless more than the Wind, Iranshahr Hall, 2013
 Antoine and the little prince, Theatre Shahr  or Teatre shahr  or Shahr-Theater  or Tehran City Theater, 2012
 Jonas and father Jepeto
 General's flasks
 Abbasgholikhan mezghounchi souvenir
 On shore of torpid river
 Killer, Gagig Karapetian, Tehran City Theater, 2011
 Kalkal nameh
 Soldier's day,Sexta Fiesta  international theater festival, Medellin- Colombia, Cali teatro, Cali- Colombia, libéré teatro, Bogota- Colombia, 2010, Tehran City Theater,2011
 Pitook
 The son of man
 Armageddon
 Me and you and Rostam and Shahnameh
 No news in Charsoo, Sangelaj Hall, 2009(تماشاخانه سنگلج)
 The black letter reading
 Kufians(Crowded Of no one)
 Forever lasting, Mehr Hall (2008), Mobarak Hall Bahman Cultural Center, 2008
 Easter, August Strindberg, Tehran City Theater,2006
 Iran, Theater forum,2005
 Dragon faced
 Apartment
 Another Pouria, Tehran City Theater, 1997
  Hero
  The Tragedy of Foroud Sivashan
 Fem & Sorrow of Zariran Memorial
  Who is inside me
 Rose smell
Sat in mud
Afrah
The last Second
Heritage
Lady Sun
The Helpless master
The cold room
Your God liked this
Scarecrow
Green per green, Behrouz Gharibpour, Isfahan University of Technology, 1989
The last dinner, Isfahan University of Technology,1989

television series 

Sat in mud tele theater, Directed by Majid Vahedizadeh (مجید واحدی‌زاده)
European passenger-Akaskhaneh series, Directed by Hassan Nangoli Ahoura حسن نانکلی اهورا.

Scenario 

 Life power 2

Radio drama 

 Iran
 Rose smell

Compilation 

 When a miracle comes to you

Paper 

ART AND ART SITUATION SINCE PREHISTORY UP TO NOW

Received Awards 

Letter of Commendation of UNICEF for supporting its stall at 6th Tehran International Book Fair
Letter of Commendation of the 6th Course of Selection of top works ofDramatic Literature of Iran, 2012.
Letter of Commendation of the 5th Course of Selection of top works of Dramatic Literature of Iran, 2011.
Letter of Commendation of Art and cultural organization of Tehran municipality for the fifth program of Criticizing Mah Theater in Tehran  Theater Club Soldier's day, 2011
Letter of Commendation of Sexta fiesta international festival,Medellin, Colombia for play writing, directing and scene designing of Soldier's day, 2010
Letter of Commendation of the 6th Annual Feast of World Theatre Day  of the Iranian theater forum, 2009
Letter of Commendation of the 5th Mah nationwide theater festival for Scene design of play Soldier's day, 2008
Letter of Commendation of the 4th Mah nationwide theater festival for second place of play Forever lasting, 2007
Honored Diploma and memorial statue of The First Provincial Festival Play writing of Provincial Festival Play writing for the selected playwright of Forever lasting, 2007
Letter of Commendation of the 4th Annual Feast of World Theatre Day of the Iranian theater forum, 2007
Letter of Commendation and memorial statue of the 2nd Great Contest of Play writing for Islamic Celebrities of Great Contest of Play writing for Islamic Celebrities for playwright of the prophet daughter-in-law (Landless more than the Wind), Art and cultural organization of Tehran municipality, 2007
Honored diploma of the 14th Festival of Radio and Television Products of Capital Cities for the best playwright of Sat in mud Isfahan, 2006
Letter of Commendation of The 2nd millennium pottery festival of Damghan Tappeh Hesar, 2006
Selected Iranian play Dragon faced for participating at White nights international theater festival, invited from Theater an der Ruhr, Mülheim, Germany, 2005
Honored diploma of Filling the empty space international theater festival for playwright of Dragon faced, Baku, Azerbaijan Republic, 2005
Letter of Commendation of the 16th Annual Theater Festival of District 6-"Golestan" Province -"Gorgan", 2005
Letter of Commendation of The 6th international theater festival of Iranzamin for play Dragon faced, 2004
Honored diploma of the 12th theater festival of state and the 5th street festival of Ardebil state for first place of playwright of Dragon faced, 2004
Honored diploma of the 6th Nationwide theater festival of state Qom for first place of playwright of Hero, 2001
Honored diploma of the 8th Soureh Nationwide theater festival for first place of playwright of Mehr Tragedy, 1999
Honored tablet of the 17th Fajr International Theater Festival, 1989
Letter of Commendation of The 4th children of mosque national theater festival for playwright and directing of your lord liked this, 1998
Letter of Commendation of The 9th International ritual & traditional theater festival, 1997
Honored diploma of The First Nationwide playlet festival for first place of playwright of Mehr Tragedy, Zahedan 1996
Honored diploma of the 3rd Nationwide Theater Festival- Atashkar for 3rd place of playwright and second place of direction of Another Pouria, 1996
Letter of Commendation of the 14th Fajr International Theater Festival, for text third place of Sat in mud, 1996
Letter of Commendation of the 13th Nationwide Theater Festival of provinces for playwright of Sat in mud, 1995
Letter of Commendation of the 13th Nationwide Theater Festival of provinces for playwright of Another Pouria, 1995
Letter of Commendation of the 11th Fajr International Theater Festival, 1992

 Notes 

 References 

 Artists data bank, Hassan Bastani
 THEATER FORUM JOURNAL, in persian, NO. 2 December 2006
  Fadjr International Theater Festival With cu Iranian Contemporary Playwrights; Hassan Bastani, in Persian, Radionamayesh, September. 2012: radionamayesh.Speaking with Hassan Bastani and Kiumars Moradi about technology situation in theater'', in Persian, شبکه رادیو ایران ,  Thursday, 23 August 2012:.

External links
 حسن باستانی در تارنمای تئاتر ایران

1962 births
Living people
Iranian theatre directors
Iranian screenwriters
Iranian dramatists and playwrights
Writers from Tehran